Buddhism is a relatively small religion in Sweden. Most of the practicing Buddhists have various Asian (mostly Thai, Chinese and Vietnamese) heritage. In 2015, the Swedish Buddhist Cooperation Council (Sveriges Buddhistiska samarbetsråd, SBS) had 7 901 members.
	
A Buddhist Temple was planned for Fredrika, a small town in the north part of Sweden. This Thai-style temple would be the biggest Buddhist temple in Europe when finished.

A 500s AD Kashmir Indian made Buddha statue made of bronze was found at Helgö in Sweden dating from the Viking era.

References

Further reading
Fredriksson, Trudy (2013). Uppvaknandets vägar : från buddhistisk historia till nutidens utövning och gemenskapsliv. SST :s skriftserie; 2. Bromma: Nämnden för statligt stöd till trossamfund. Libris länk. 
Plank, Katarina (2010). Mindful Medicine: The Growing Trend of Mindfulness-Based Therapies in the Swedish Health Care System, Finnish Journal of Ethnicity and Migration 5 (2), 47-55
Plank, Katarina (2015). The sacred foodscapes of Thai Buddhist temples in Sweden, Scripta Instituti Donneriani Aboensis 26, 201-224

External links
Buddhism Today - Sweden: A growing interest in Buddhism
Swedish Buddhist Community
Sveriges Buddhistiska Samarbetsråd

 
Sweden, Buddhism in
Religion in Sweden
Swe